Matthew David McQueen (born May 20, 1984), better known by his stage name Matthewdavid, is an American record producer and DJ based in Los Angeles, California. He is a co-founder of Leaving Records. He has collaborated with Sun Araw, Dog Bite, and Serengeti.

Early life
Matthewdavid was born in Atlanta, Georgia. As a child, he took guitar lessons and piano lessons. At the age of 14, he moved to Gulf Breeze, Florida with his family. At the age of 15, he started making music. He attended Florida State University. In 2006, he moved to Los Angeles, California. He interned at Plug Research and Dublab.

Career
In 2008, Matthewdavid and Jesse Moretti co-founded Leaving Records. His debut studio album, Outmind, was released on Brainfeeder in 2011. The follow-up studio album, In My World, was released on Brainfeeder in 2014. Under the moniker Matthewdavid's Mindflight, he released Trust the Guide and Glide in 2016, and Ophiuchus in 2017.

Discography

Studio albums
 Outmind (2011)
 In My World (2014)
 Trust the Guide and Glide (2016) 
 Ophiuchus (2017)

Compilation albums
 Disk Collection (2009)
 Disk II (2012)
 Time Flying Beats (2018)

Live albums
 Livephreaxxx!!! (2011) 
 A Meditation on Events in 2016 (2016)

EPs
 Spills (2008)
 Los Angeles 2/10 (2010) 
 Davis (2011) 
 Swedish Fish (2011) 
 International (2011)
 Culture Mystery (2012)
 Jewelry (2012)
 Destin (2012)
 Producers in 2012 Learn to Spread Love (2012)
 Mindflight (2013)
 Spore Drive (2019)

References

External links
 
 

1984 births
Living people
American electronic musicians
Record producers from Georgia (U.S. state)
Musicians from Atlanta
Brainfeeder artists